A future history is a postulated history of the future and is used by authors of science fiction and other speculative fiction to construct a common background for fiction. Sometimes the author publishes a timeline of events in the history, while other times the reader can reconstruct the order of the stories from information provided therein.

Background 
The term appears to have been coined by John W. Campbell, Jr., the editor of Astounding Science Fiction, in the February 1941 issue of that magazine, in reference to Robert A. Heinlein's Future History. Neil R. Jones is generally credited as the first author to create a future history.

A set of stories which share a backdrop but are not really concerned with the sequence of history in their universe are rarely considered future histories. For example, neither Lois McMaster Bujold's Vorkosigan Saga nor George R. R. Martin's 1970s short stories which share a backdrop are generally considered future histories. Standalone stories which trace an arc of history are rarely considered future histories.

Earlier, some works were published which constituted "future history" in a more literal sense—i.e., stories or whole books purporting to be excerpts of a history book from the future and which are written in the form of a history book—i.e., having no personal protagonists but rather describing the development of nations and societies over decades and centuries.

Such works include:

 Jack London's The Unparalleled Invasion (1914) describing a devastating war between an alliance of Western nations and China in 1975, ending with a complete genocide of the Chinese. It is described in a short footnote as "Excerpt from Walt Mervin's 'Certain Essays in History'.
 André Maurois's The War against the Moon (1928), where a band of well-meaning conspirators intend to avert a devastating world war by uniting humanity in hatred of a fictitious Lunar enemy  only to find that the moon is truly inhabited and that they had unwittingly set off the first interplanetary war. This, too, is explicitly described as an excerpt from a future history book.
 The most ambitious of this subgenre is H. G. Wells' The Shape of Things to Come (1933), written in the form of a history book published in the year 2106 and—in the manner of a real history book—containing numerous footnotes and references to the works of (mostly fictitious) prominent historians of the 20th and 21st centuries.

Notable future histories 
 Poul Anderson's two future histories: The Psychotechnic League and his later Technic History (see Nicholas van Rijn, Dominic Flandry)
 Isaac Asimov's Foundation, Galactic Empire and Robot series
 Stephen Baxter's two future histories: Xeelee Sequence, 1991–2018, and his Evolution short story collection
 James Blish's Cities in Flight
 Alan Dean Foster's Humanx Commonwealth novels
 Frank Herbert's  Dune universe
 Steve Jackson Games' role-playing game Transhuman Space
 Neil R. Jones's Professor Jameson series (1931–1989)
 Andrey Livadny's The History of the Galaxy series
 Lois Lowry's The Giver quartet
 Paul J. McAuley's Four Hundred Billion Stars series (1988)
 Larry Niven's Known Space
 H. Beam Piper's Terro-Human Future History
 Alastair Reynolds' Revelation Space universe
 Clifford D. Simak's City stories
 Cordwainer Smith's Instrumentality of Mankind stories
 Olaf Stapledon's Last and First Men and Star Maker
 The Strugatsky brothers' Noon Universe
 Scott Westerfeld's Uglies series
 John Wyndham's The Outward Urge stories
 2000 AD'''s Judge Dredd world

 Difference from "alternate history" 
Unlike alternate history, where alternative outcomes are ascribed to past events, future history postulates certain outcomes to events in the writer's present and future.

The essential difference is that the writer of alternate history is in possession of knowledge of the actual outcome of a certain event, and that knowledge influences also the description of the event's alternate outcome. The writer of future history does not have such knowledge, such works being based on speculations and predictions current at the time of writing.

Future becoming past

The future projected in a "future history" can often turn out to be wildly inaccurate.

For example, in 1933 H. G. Wells postulated in The Shape of Things to Come a Second World War in which Nazi Germany and Poland are evenly matched militarily, fighting an indecisive war over ten years; and Poul Anderson's early 1950s Psychotechnic League depicted a world undergoing a devastating nuclear war in 1958, yet by the early 21st century managing not only to rebuild the ruins on Earth but also engage in extensive space colonization of the Moon and several planets. A writer possessing knowledge of the actual swift collapse of Poland in World War II and the enormous actual costs of far less ambitious space programs in a far less devastated world would have been unlikely to postulate such outcomes. 2001: A Space Odyssey was set in the future and featured developments in space travel and habitation  which have not occurred on the timescale postulated.

A problem with future history science fiction is that it will date and be overtaken by real historical events, for instance H. Beam Piper's future history, which included a nuclear war in 1973, and much of the future history of Star Trek. Jerry Pournelle's "CoDominium" future history assumed that the Cold War would end with the United States and Soviet Union establishing a co-rule of the world, the CoDominium of the title, which would last into the 22nd Century—rather than the Soviet Union collapsing in 1991.

There are several ways this is dealt with. One solution to the problem is when some authors set their stories in an indefinite future, often in a society where the current calendar has been disrupted due to a societal collapse or undergone some form of distortion due to the impact of technology. Related to the first, some stories are set in the very remote future and only deal with the author's contemporary history in a sketchy fashion, if at all (e.g. the original Foundation Trilogy by Asimov). Another related case is where stories are set in the near future, but with an explicitly allohistorical past, as in Ken MacLeod's Engines of Light series.

In other cases, the merging of the fictional history and the known history is done through extensive use of retroactive continuity. In yet other cases, such as the Doctor Who television series and the fiction based on it, much use is made of secret history, in which the events that take place are largely secret and not known to the general public.

As with Heinlein, some authors simply write a detailed future history and accept the fact that events will overtake it, making the sequence into a de facto'' alternate history.

Lastly, some writers formally transform their future histories into alternate history, once they had been overtaken by events. For example, Poul Anderson started The Psychotechnic League history in the early 1950s, assuming a nuclear war in 1958—then a future date. When it was republished in the 1980s, a new foreword was added explaining how that history's timeline diverged from ours and led to war.

See also 
 Alternate future
 Near future in fiction
 Far future in fiction
 Futures studies
 Post-apocalyptic science fiction
 World War III

References 

 
Systems thinking
History
Science fiction themes